Diego Fernando Herazo Moreno (born 14 April 1996) is a Colombian footballer who plays as a forward for Millonarios.

Career

Herazo started his career with Colombian top flight side Independiente Medellín, where he made 9 appearances and scored 0 goals. On 27 July 2015, he debuted for Independiente Medellín during a 1–0 win over Deportes Tolima.

Before the 2018 season, Herazo signed for Valledupar in the Colombian second division.

Before the 2019 season, he returned to Colombian top flight club Independiente Medellín.

References

External links
 
 

Living people
Colombian footballers
Association football forwards
1995 births
Categoría Primera A players
Independiente Medellín footballers
Cúcuta Deportivo footballers
Atlético Bucaramanga footballers
La Equidad footballers
Valledupar F.C. footballers
Categoría Primera B players
Sportspeople from Chocó Department
21st-century Colombian people